The 2018 FIFA U-20 Women's World Cup was the ninth edition of the FIFA U-20 Women's World Cup, the biennial international women's youth football championship contested by the under-20 national teams of the member associations of FIFA, since its inception in 2002 as the FIFA U-19 Women's World Championship (age limit was raised from 19 to 20 in 2006).

The tournament was held in Brittany, France between 5 and 24 August 2018, who would also host the 2019 FIFA Women's World Cup. Haiti and the Netherlands made their U-20 Women's World Cup debuts. North Korea were the defending champions but were eliminated by host France in the quarter-finals.

The final took place at Stade de la Rabine, Vannes between Spain and Japan, a rematch from the group stage. Japan won their first title, beating Spain 3–1 in the Final.

Host selection
On 6 March 2014, FIFA announced that bidding had begun for the 2018 FIFA U-20 Women's World Cup. Member associations interested in hosting must submit a declaration of interest by 15 April 2014, and provide the complete set of bidding documents by 31 October 2014. The FIFA Executive Committee would select the hosts in 2015. In principle, FIFA preferred the 2019 FIFA Women's World Cup and the 2018 FIFA U-20 Women's World Cup to be hosted by the same member association, but if circumstances required, FIFA reserved the right to award the hosting of the events separately.

The following countries made official bids for hosting the 2018 FIFA U-20 Women's World Cup and the 2019 FIFA Women's World Cup by submitting their documents by 31 October 2014:
 
 

The following countries withdrew their bid for hosting the 2018 FIFA U-20 Women's World Cup and the 2019 FIFA Women's World Cup:
  - England registered an expression of interest by the April 2014 deadline, but in June 2014 it was announced that they would no longer proceed.
  - New Zealand registered an expression of interest by the April 2014 deadline, but in June 2014 it was announced that they would no longer proceed.
  - South Africa registered an expression of interest by the April 2014 deadline, but in June 2014 it was announced that they would no longer proceed.

France were awarded the hosting rights of both tournaments by the FIFA Executive Committee on 19 March 2015.

Qualified teams
A total of 16 teams qualified for the final tournament. In addition to France, which qualified automatically as hosts, the other 15 teams qualified from six separate continental competitions. The slot allocation was approved by the FIFA Council on 13–14 October 2016.

Venues
The four host cities, all located in the region of Brittany, were announced on 7 September 2017. The opening match, semi-finals, third place match and final were played in Vannes.

Branding
The official emblem was unveiled on 22 September 2017.

Draw
The official draw was held on 8 March 2018, 11:00 CET (UTC+1), at the Rennes Opera House in Rennes. The teams were seeded based on their performances in previous U-20 Women's World Cups and confederation tournaments, with the hosts France automatically seeded and assigned to position A1. Teams of the same confederation could not meet in the group stage, except for UEFA with five teams so one group would contain two UEFA teams.

Squads

Players born between 1 January 1998 and 31 December 2002 were eligible to compete in the tournament. Each team had to name a preliminary squad of 35 players. From the preliminary squad, the team had to name a final squad of 21 players (three of whom must be goalkeepers) by the FIFA deadline. Players in the final squad could be replaced due to serious injury up to 24 hours prior to kickoff of the team's first match.

Match officials
A total of 15 referees and 30 assistant referees were appointed by FIFA for the tournament.

Group stage
The official schedule was unveiled on 17 January 2018.

The top two teams of each group advanced to the quarter-finals. The rankings of teams in each group were determined as follows (regulations Article 17.7):

If two or more teams were equal on the basis of the above three criteria, their rankings were determined as follows:

All times are local, CEST (UTC+2).

Group A

Group B

Group C

Group D

Knockout stage
In the knockout stages, if a match was level at the end of normal playing time, extra time would be played (two periods of 15 minutes each) and followed, if necessary, by a penalty shoot-out to determine the winner. However, for the third place match, no extra time was played and the winner was determined by a penalty shoot-out if necessary.

Bracket

Quarter-finals

Semi-finals

Third place match

Final

Awards
The following awards were given for the tournament:

Goalscorers

References

External links

FIFA Technical Report

2018
2018 in women's association football
2018 in youth association football
International association football competitions hosted by France
2018–19 in French women's football
August 2018 sports events in Europe